Joseph Christian Leyendecker (March 23, 1874 – July 25, 1951) was one of the most prominent and financially successful freelance commercial artists working in the U.S. He was active between 1895 and 1951 producing artwork hundreds of posters, books, advertisements, and magazine covers and stories. He is best known for his 80 covers for Collier's Weekly, 322 covers for The Saturday Evening Post, and advertising illustrations for B. Kuppenheimer suits and Arrow brand shirts and collars. He is one of the few (known) homosexual artists working in the early twentieth century U.S.

Early life
Leyendecker (also known as 'J. C.' or 'Joe') was born on March 23, 1874 in Montabaur, Germany to Peter Leyendecker (1838–1916) and Elizabeth Ortseifen Leyendecker (1845–1905). His brother and fellow illustrator Francis Xavier (aka "Frank") was born three years later. In 1882, the entire Leyendecker family immigrated to Chicago, Illinois, where Elizabeth's brother Adam Ortseifen was vice-president of the McAvoy Brewing Company. A sister, Mary Augusta, arrived after the family immigrated to America.

As a teenager, around 1890, J. C. Leyendecker apprenticed at the Chicago printing and engraving company J. Manz & Company, eventually working his way up to staff artist. At the same time he took night classes at the school of the Chicago Art Institute.

After studying drawing and anatomy under John Vanderpoel at the Chicago Art Institute, J. C. and Frank enrolled in the Académie Julian in Paris from October 1895 through June 1897. Upon their return from Paris to Chicago, the Leyendecker brothers took an apartment in Hyde Park, Illinois. They also shared a studio in Chicago's Fine Arts Building at 410 South Michigan Ave.

Career

Before 1900: Chicago and Paris 
As a staff artist at J. Manz & Company J. C. Leyendecker produced 60 Bible illustrations for the Powers Brothers Company, cover and interior illustrations for The Interior magazine, and frontispiece art for The Inland Printer. He also produced artwork for posters and book covers for the Chicago publisher E. A. Weeks. He also provided artwork for a range of marketing materials for the Chicago men's clothier Hart, Schaffner & Marx.

While in Paris, J. C. Leyendecker continued providing art to Hart, Schaffner & Marx, produced artwork for 12 covers of The Inland Printer, and won a contest (out of 700 entries) for the poster and cover of the midsummer 1896 issue of The Century magazine, which garnered national newspaper and magazine coverage.

Upon his return from Paris in June 1897, Leyendecker illustrated for a range of clients including Hart, Schaffner & Marx, the Chicago department store Carson, Pirie & Scott, the Eastern Illinois railroad, the Northern Pacific Railroad, Woman's Home Companion magazine, the stonecutter's trade journal Stone, Carter's monthly, the bird hobbyist magazine The Osprey, and books including Conan Doyle's Micah Clarke and Octave Thanet's A Book of True Lovers. He also painted 132 scenes of America for L. W. Yaggy's touring panorama titled Royal Scroll published by Powers, Fowler & Lewis (Chicago).

On May 20, 1899, Leyendecker received his first commission for a cover for The Saturday Evening Post beginning a forty-four-year association with the magazine. Ultimately, he would produce 322 covers for the magazine, introducing many iconic visual images and traditions including the New Year's Baby, the pudgy red-garbed rendition of Santa Claus, flowers for Mother's Day, and firecrackers on the 4th of July.

During the 1890s, Leyendecker was active in Chicago's art world. He exhibited with and attended social events by the Palette and Chisel Club, the Art Students League, and the Chicago Society of Artists. In December 1895, some of his posters were exhibited at the Siegel, Cooper & Company department store in Chicago. In January 1898 his posters for covers of The Inland Printer were exhibited at the Kimball Cafetier (Chicago).

During his time studying in Paris, J. C. Leyendecker's work won four awards at the Académie Julian and one of his paintings titled "Portrait of My Brother" was exhibited in the Paris salon in 1897. One of J. C. Leyendecker's poster for Hart, Schaffner & Marx titled "The Horse Show" was exhibited as part of the award winning display of American manufacturers' posters at the Exposition Universelle (1900) in Paris.

After 1900: New York and New Rochelle 
After relocating to New York City in 1900, Leyendecker continued illustrating books, magazine covers and interiors, posters, and advertisements for a wide range of ever-larger and more-prominent clients.

His illustrations for men's product advertising, pulp magazines, and college posters earned him a reputation as specialist in illustrations of men. Major clients included the Philadelphia suitmaker A. B. Kirschbaum, Wick Fancy Hat Bands, Gillette Safety Razors, E. Howard & Co. watches, Ivory Soap, Williams Shaving Cream, Karo Corn Syrup, Kingsford's Corn Starch, Interwoven socks, B. Kuppenheimer & Co., Cooper Underwear, and Cluett, Peabody & Company, maker of Arrow brand shirts and detachable shirt collars and cuffs.

The male models who appeared in Leyendecker's 1907-30 illustrations for Arrow shirt and collar ads were often referred to as "the" Arrow Collar Man even though they were modeled by a number of different men, some of whom went on to successful careers in theater, film, and television. Some models include Brian Donlevy, Fredric March, Jack Mulhall, Neil Hamilton, Ralph Forbes, and Reed Howes.

One of his most frequently used models was the Canadian-born Charles A. Beach (1881–1954). Leyendecker met Beach in 1903 when Beach came to the artist's New York studio looking for modeling work. Beach subsequently appeared in many of Leyendecker's illustrations and the two enjoyed a nearly 50-year professional and personal relationship. Many Leyendecker biographers have described that relationship as having a romantic and sexual dimension.

Another important Leyendecker client Kellogg's cereals. As part of a major advertising campaign, he created a series of twenty "Kellogg's Kids" to promote Kellogg's Corn Flakes.

During the first World War, he also painted recruitment posters for the United States military and the war effort.

Decline of career 
After 1930, Leyendecker's career began to slow, perhaps in reaction to the popularity of his work in the previous decade or as a result of the economic downturn following the Wall Street Crash of 1929.

Around 1930-31, Cluett Peabody & Company ceased using Leyendecker's illustrations in its advertisements for Arrow collars and shirts. In 1936, George Horace Lorimer, the famous editor at the Saturday Evening Post, retired and was replaced by Wesley Winans Stout (1937–1942) and then Ben Hibbs (1942–1962), both of whom rarely commissioned Leyendecker to illustrate covers. Leyendecker's last cover for the Saturday Evening Post was of a New Year Baby for the January 2, 1943 issue.

New commissions were fewer in the 1930s and 1940s. These included posters for the United States Department of War, in which Leyendecker depicted commanding officers of the armed forces encouraging the purchases of bonds to support the nation's efforts in World War II.

Personal life

Sexuality 
Not unusually, no indications (in Leyendecker's own words) survive concerning his sexual desires, behavior, or identity, however what is known about his personal life fits the pattern of many homosexuals who lived during his time.

Leyendecker never married, and he lived with another man, model Charles A. Beach, for most of his adult life (1903-1951). Beach was Leyendecker's studio manager and frequent model, and many biographers describe Beach as Leyendecker's romantic, sexual, or "life" partner. They also describe Leyendecker as "gay" or "homosexual."

Residences 
In 1915, J. C., brother Frank, and sister Mary Augusta relocated from New York City to a newly built home and art studio in New Rochelle, New York, an art colony and suburb of nearby New York City. Sometime after 1918, Charles Beach also moved into the New Rochelle home.

Leyendecker and Beach reportedly hosted large galas attended by people of consequence from all sectors. The parties they hosted at their New Rochelle home/studio were important social and celebrity making events.

While Beach often organized the famous gala-like social gatherings that Leyendecker was known for in the 1920s, he reportedly (by Norman Rockwell) also contributed largely to Leyendecker's social isolation in his later years. Beach reportedly forbade outside contact with the artist in the last months of his life.

Due to his professional success, Leyendecker enjoyed a luxurious lifestyle with large home, domestic servants, and chauffeured car. However, when commissions began to wane in the 1930s, he was forced to curtail spending considerably. By the time of his death, Leyendecker had let all of the household staff at his New Rochelle estate go, with he and Beach attempting to maintain their home themselves.

Death, Burial, Disposition of Estate 
Leyendecker died on July 25, 1951, at his home in New Rochelle of an acute coronary occlusion.

Leyendecker's will directed his estate—house, furnishings, paintings, etc.—be divided equally between his sister and Charles Beach. Though Leyendecker directed Beach to burn his drawings upon his death, Beach instead sold many of his drawings and paintings at a lawn sale. Other Leyendecker works were given to the New York Public Library and Metropolitan Museum of Art. Mary Augusta retained many of Leyendecker's paitings for Kellogg's cereals, and donated them along with other family ephemera upon her death to the Haggin Museum.

Leyendecker is buried alongside his parents and brother Frank at Woodlawn Cemetery in The Bronx, New York City. Charles Allwood Beach died of a heart attack on June 21, 1954 at New Rochelle. The location of his burial is unknown. Although the register for St. Paul's Church, New Rochelle, indicates internment at Ferncliff Cemetery in Hartsdale, New York, the cemetery has no record of the burial.

Body of work

Notable clients

 Amoco
 Boy Scouts of America
 The Century Company
 Chesterfield Cigarettes
 Cluett, Peabody & Company
 Collier's Weekly
 Cooper Underwear
 Cream of Wheat
 Curtis Publishing Company
 Franklin Automobile
 Hart Schaffner & Marx
 Howard Watch
 Ivory Soap
 Karo Corn Syrup
 Kellogg Company
 Kuppenheimer
 Overland Automobile
 Palmolive Soap
 Pierce Arrow Automobile
 Procter & Gamble
 The Timken Company
 Saturday Evening Post
 U.S. Army
 U.S. Marines
 U.S. Navy
 Wick Fancy Hat Bands
 Willys-Overland Company

Museum holdings
Examples of his original artwork can be found in the collections of the Metropolitan Museum of Art (New York City), Norman Rockwell Museum (Stockbridge, MA), Haggin Museum (Stockton, CA), National Museum of American Illustration (Newport, RI), Lucas Museum of Narrative Art (Los Angeles, CA), and Pritzker Military Museum & Library in Chicago, IL. Significant collections of Leyendecker's work as reproduced can be found in many major archives and library collections including the Hagley Museum and Library (Wilmington, DE), Winterthur Museum, Garden and Library (Wilmington, DE), New York Public Library (New York, NY), and the D. B. Dowd Modern Graphic History Library Archives at Washington University in St. Louis (St. Louis, MO).

Legacy
As the premier cover illustrator for the enormously popular Saturday Evening Post for much of the first half of the 20th century, Leyendecker's work both reflected and helped mold many of the visual aspects of the era's culture in America. The mainstream image of Santa Claus as a jolly fat man in a red fur-trimmed coat was popularized by Leyendecker, as was the image of the New Year Baby.  depicting a young bellhop carrying hyacinths. It was created as a commemoration of President Woodrow Wilson's declaration of Mother's Day as an official holiday that year.

Leyendecker was a chief influence upon, and friend of, Norman Rockwell, who was a pallbearer at Leyendecker's funeral. In particular, the early work of Norman Rockwell for the Saturday Evening Post bears a strong superficial resemblance to that of Leyendecker. While today it is generally accepted that Norman Rockwell established the best-known visual images of Americana, in many cases they are derivative of Leyendecker's work, or reinterpretations of visual themes established by Rockwell's idol.

The visual style of Leyendecker's art inspired the graphics in The Dagger of Amon Ra, a video game, as well as designs in Team Fortress 2, a first-person shooter for the PC, Xbox 360, and PlayStation 3.

Leyendecker's work inspired George Lucas and will be part of the collection of the anticipated Lucas Museum of Narrative Art.

Leyendecker's Beat-up Boy, Football Hero, which appeared on the cover of The Saturday Evening Post on November 21, 1914, sold for $4.12 million on May 7, 2021. The previous world record for a J. C. Leyendecker original was set in December 2020, when Sotheby's sold his 1930 work Carousel Ride for $516,100.

Costume designer Carol Cutshall used Leyendecker's illustrations as inspiration for the costumes created for Anne Rice's Interview with the Vampire on AMC, a 2022 television series adaptation of the 1976 novel by American author Anne Rice. Of the clothing designed specifically for the male characters Louis de Pointe du Lac and Lestat de Lioncourt, Cutshall said, in part, "And the whole first two episodes, their style sense in many ways is a love letter to Leyendecker. Some things are just perfectly pulled from – like their formalwear, their tuxedos that they wear to the opera in 1917, and the black pinstripe suit with the green tie and the white boutonniere that Lestat wears to the du Lac family home for dinner – those are from a Leyendecker illustration." Cutshall also referenced Louis and Lestat's clothing being created from Leyendecker's illustrations as a way to draw a parallel between Louis and Lestat, who were shown in the series as having to keep their romantic relationship hidden from the public in the 1910s and 1920s, and Leyendecker and his life partner, Charles Beach.

Films and plays
In Love with the Arrow Collar Man, a play written by Lance Ringel and directed by Chuck Muckle at Theatre 80 St. Marks from November to December 2017, dramatizes the life of Leyendecker and his life partner Charles Beach.

Coded, a 2021 film documentary, tells the story of Leyendecker and premiered at the TriBeCa Film Festival in 2021.

Gallery

See also

Frank Xavier Leyendecker

References

Further reading
 Carter, Alice A., Judy Francis Zankel, and Terry Brown. Americans Abroad: J. C. Leyendecker and the European Academic Influence on American Illustration. New York: Society of Illustrators, 2008.   
 Cutler, Judy Goffman, and Laurence S. Cutler. Norman Rockwell and His Mentor, J. C. Leyendecker. Newport, R.I. : National Museum of American Illustration, 2010.  
 Cutler, Judy Goffman, and Laurence S. Cutler. J. C. Leyendecker: American Imagist. New York: Abrams, 2008.   
 Ermoyan, Arpi. Famous American Illustrators. [Crans, Switzerland]: Published for the Society of Illustrators by Rotovision, 1997.     
  Leyendecker, J. C. An Exhibition of Original Poster Designs ... Under the Auspices of "The Inland Printer"... January 11 to 31, 1898. 1898. 
 Leyendecker, J. C. The Saturday Evening Post: An Illustrated Weekly Magazine ... December 29, 1906 ... New Year's. Philadelphia: s.n, 1906.   
 Meyer, Susan E. America's Great Illustrators. New York : H. N. Abrams, 1978.  
 Moroney, Lindsay Anne. High Art Joins Popular Culture: The Life and Cover Art of J.C. Leyendecker. Thesis (Honors), College of William and Mary, 2004.  
 Saunders, David. The Art of J. C. Leyendecker. Decatur, IL: The Illustrated Press, 2021.
 Schau, Michael. J. C. Leyendecker. New York: Watson-Guptill Publications, 1974.  
 Steine, Kent and Fred Taraba. The J. C. Leyendecker Collection: American Illustrators Poster Book. Portland, Ore. : Collectors Press, 1996.  
 The J. C. Leyendecker Poster Book. New York: Watson-Guptill Publications, 1975.

External links

Leyendecker Collection at The National Museum of American Illustration
Leyendecker biography, with illustrations from JVJ Publishing 
J.C. Leyendecker at Open Letters
Leyendecker Collection at The Haggin Museum
UNCG American Publishers' Trade Bindings: J.C. Leyendecker
 

1874 births
1951 deaths
Académie Julian alumni
Fashion illustrators
19th-century American painters
American male painters
20th-century American painters
American gay artists
German emigrants to the United States
Culture of New Rochelle, New York
People from Westerwaldkreis
Artists from New Rochelle, New York
School of the Art Institute of Chicago alumni
People from the Rhine Province
Burials at Woodlawn Cemetery (Bronx, New York)
The Saturday Evening Post people
19th-century American male artists
20th-century American male artists